Photinia zhejiangensis is in the family Rosaceae of flowering plants.

References

zhejiangensis